Thomas Hengen (born 22 September 1974) is a German former professional footballer who played as a defender.

Playing career
Born in Landau in the Palatinate, Hengen was in the amateur side of the SV Rülzheim and Phönix Bellheim before he moved 1989 to 1. FC Kaiserslautern. With the A youth team, he won the German youth championship in 1993. As an international youth player, he amassed a total of 13 international matches in the U16 and U18, then another 13 games for the U21 national team.

In the 1992–93 season, he debuted for 1. FC Kaiserslautern his first Bundesliga match. In his last game for 1. FC Kaiserslautern, he won the German Cup in Berlin in May 1996.

He then accepted the offer of Karlsruher SC who, after the departure of Jens Nowotny, were on the lookout for a new defense boss. He fit seamlessly into the team in his first season 1996–97 at KSC and completed 30 of 34 games. In the following season, the KSC relegated from the Bundesliga but  Hengen stayed in the Bundesliga playing for Borussia Dortmund, VfL Wolfsburg and Kaiserslautern, only interrupted by a brief interlude with Beşiktaş J.K. Overall, he amassed 224 Bundesliga matches and seven goals.

In 2004, he moved to the 2. Bundesliga side Alemannia Aachen, but did not play any more because of a chronic hip osteoarthritis. After unsuccessful rehabilitation, he retired in early 2006.

Post-playing career
From 2006 to 2007, he was head of the junior excellence centre of TSV Alemannia Aachen. In the 2007–08 season, he took over the training of the second team until the end of the season.

Honours
 DFB-Pokal: 1995–96

References

1974 births
Living people
German footballers
Bundesliga players
VfL Wolfsburg players
Beşiktaş J.K. footballers
1. FC Kaiserslautern II players
1. FC Kaiserslautern players
Karlsruher SC players
Alemannia Aachen players
Borussia Dortmund players
Germany under-21 international footballers
Germany B international footballers
Association football defenders
People from Landau
Footballers from Rhineland-Palatinate
West German footballers